Qebleh Daghi Rural District is in Howmeh District of Azarshahr County, East Azerbaijan province, Iran. At the census of 2006, its population was 8,342 in 2,016 households; there were 8,659 inhabitants in 2,399 households at the following census of 2011; and in the most recent census of 2016, the population of the rural district was 8,239 in 2,498 households. The largest of its 12 villages was Nadilu, with 3,436 people.

References 

Azarshahr County

Rural Districts of East Azerbaijan Province

Populated places in East Azerbaijan Province

Populated places in Azarshahr County